Roger F. Duffy (November 19, 1925 – March 31, 2007) is a former Democratic member of the Pennsylvania House of Representatives.

References

Democratic Party members of the Pennsylvania House of Representatives
2007 deaths
1925 births
20th-century American politicians